Top Doorslammer is a professional (Pro) class of Australian drag racing.  It caters to full-bodied racing sedans which are replicas of Australian or US production vehicles.  The class uses 514 cu. in. displacement (8.5-litre), mechanically supercharged V8 engines which are fueled by methanol. The minimum weight break for these vehicles is 2700 lbs (1225 kg). It is similar to the Pro Modified class as defined by the NHRA.

Top Doorslammer is regulated by ANDRA, and is considered a Group 1 or professional category.  It is the fastest sedan based category in the world, using replicas of front-engined production sedans, coupes, station wagon and utility vehicles usually produced by Holden, Ford, Dodge, Studebaker and Chevrolet. As its name suggests, these cars have operational doors, therefore Funny Car style bodies are not allowed in this class.

Some notable drivers competing in this category are John Zappia, Peter Kapiris, Victor Bray, Ben Bray, Gary Phillips, and Maurice Fabietti.  During the summer months, because of rules similar to Pro Modified, such stars in the United States frequently appear during the North American winter during the International Hot Rod Association 400 Thunder series currently.  For example, during the 2017-18 IHRA season, Texan Frankie "Mad Man" Taylor drove a second Bray Racing car when the drag strips closed for the winter.

Top Doorslammer originally started out as an exhibition class called Wild Bunch with notable pioneers John Zappia and Victor Bray.  After a number of successful years of running the class, ANDRA recognised the class worthy of a professional bracket.  By 1996 Top Doorslammer was officially recognised as a Group 1 class, and has since grown into one of the most successful brackets.

Television broadcasting
Top Doorslammer Championship is on SBS Speedweek and the new SPEED Channel on Foxtel.

2010/2011 ANDRA Pro Series Championship calendar and results
Round 1:  Fuchs Australian nationals 10–12 September, Sydney Dragway, NSW
Runner Up: Maurice Fabietti  Winner: Robin Judd

Round 2:  Goldenstate Titles 3–4 Dec, Perth Motorplex, WA
Runner up: John Zappia Winner:Mark Belleri

Round 3:  40th Westernationals 5–6 March, Perth Motorplex, WA
Runner up: Maurice Fabietti  Winner:John Zappia

Round 4:  ANDRA Pro Series 18–19 March, Sydney Dragway, NSW "RAIN OUT"

Round 5:  2011 Nitro Champs 29 April – 1 May, Sydney Dragway, NSW
Runner up: Peter Kapiris  Winner: John Zappia

Round 6:

Round 7:  2011 Castrol EDGE Winternationals  Willowbank Raceway, QLD RAIN OUT FINAL Finalist:Mark Belleri and Peter Kapiris

2011/2012 ANDRA Pro Series Championship calendar

Round 1:  2011 Fuchs Australian nationals 9–11 September, Sydney Drag way, NSW WINNER: Peter Kapiris

Round 2:  2011 40th Annual Goldenstate Titles 18–19 November, Perth Motorplex, WA WINNER: Peter Kapiris

Round 3:  2012 41st Westernationals 3–4 March, Perth Motorplex, WA WINNER: John Zappia

Round 4:   23–24 March, Sydney Dragway, NSW
WINNER: John Zappia

Round 5:  2012 Nitro Champs, 4–6 May, Sydney Dragway, NSW
WINNER: John Zappia

Round 6:  2012 45th FUCHS Winternationals 8–11 June Willowbank Raceway, QLD

2011/2012 ANDRA Pro Series Championship points Top Ten

Points Allocation

Winner-             100

Runner up-          80

Semi Final lose-   60

Quarter Final Lose- 40

Non Qualifier-      20

Low Elapsed Time-   5

Top Speed-          5

50% bonus for points scored at Championship rounds in Western Australia

Top Doorslammer drivers

ANDRA National records

Elapsed Time: 5.693 seconds John Zappia, 7 June 2015, FUCHS Winternationals, Willowbank Raceway

Speed: 258.42 mph (415.89 km/h) P. Kapiris, Sydney Dragway, May 2013.

Track records
Perth Motorplex

Track ET Record - 5.683 Seconds John Zappia, 6 February 2016

Track Speed Record - 253.86 mph (408.55 km/h) John Zappia, 6 February 2016

Top Doorslammer 5 Second Club
The Top Doorslammer 5 Second Club is a group of drivers who have run a quarter-mile in the 5 second range.  Only 12 drivers have ever managed to run a 5-second time.  John Zappia was the first in the world to run a legal Doorslammer 5 with a 5.967 second pass at 241.97 mph, on 17 September 2005, in his Rentco Monaro Top Doorslammer at Western Sydney International Raceway, NSW.

Pro Series sponsors

Official sponsors
 Fuchs
 Sidchrome Official tool

ANDRA Pro Series tracks

Perth Motorplex Kwinana Beach, WA
Western Sydney International Dragway Eastern Creek, NSW
Willowbank Raceway Ipswich, QLD
Adelaide International Raceway South Australia
Hidden Valley Raceway Darwin, Northern Territory

Past champions

References

Drag racing classes
Motorsport categories in Australia